The 1940 Michigan Intercollegiate Athletic Association football season was the season of college football played by the six member schools of the Michigan Intercollegiate Athletic Association (MIAA) as part of the 1940 college football season.

The Albion Britons, led by head coach Dale R. Sprankle and halfback Morris Trimble, won the MIAA championship with a 7–1 record (5–0 against conference opponents). Albion also won the 1939 MIAA championship, and the 1940 team returned a veteran team except for the center position.

The Alma Scots, led by head coach Gordon MacDonald, finished in second place with a 5–2 record (4–1 against MIAA opponents), losing to Albion on November 9 for its only conference defeat.

Conference overview

Teams

Albion

The 1940 Albion Britons football team represented Albion College of Albion, Michigan. In their 18th year under head coach Dale R. Sprankle, the Britons compiled a 7–1 record (5–0 against MIAA opponents) and won the MIAA championship. Albion won 14 consecutive games during the 1939 and 1940 season, finally losing to Lake Forest in the final game of the 1940 season.

Three Albion players received first-team honors on the 1940 All-M.I.A.A. football team: halfback Maurice Trimble; end Charles VanderLinde; and guard Walter Ptak.

Alma

The 1940 Alma Scots football team represented Alma College of Alma, Michigan. In their fifth year under head coach Gordon MacDonald, the Scots compiled a 5–2 record (4–1 against MIAA opponents) and finished in second place in the MIAA.

Four Alma players were named to the All-Michigan Intercollegiate Athletic Association football team: quarterback J. Tait; end Keith Carey; tackle E. Ziem; and guard G. Barnett.

Hope

The 1940 Hope Flying Dutchmen football team represented Hope College of Hope, Michigan. In their 10th year under head coach Bud Hinga, the Dutchmen compiled a 3–3–1 record (2–2–1 against MIAA opponents) and finished in third place in the MIAA.

Hillsdale

The 1940 Hillsdale Dales football team was an American football team that represented Hillsdale College in the Michigan Intercollegiate Athletic Association (MIAA) during the 1941 college football season. In their 14th year under head coach Dwight Harwood, the Dales compiled a 3–4–1 record (1–3–1 against MIAA opponents) and finished in fourth place out of six teams in the MIAA.

Center Robert Manby was selected as a first-team player on the 1940 All-MIAA football team.

Adrian

The 1940 Adrian Bulldogs football team represented Adrian College of Adrian, Michigan. In their third year under head coach Harve A. Oliphant, the Bulldogs compiled a 1–7 record (1–4 against MIAA opponents) and finished in fifth place out of six teams in the MIAA.

Kalamazoo

The 1940 Kalamazoo Hornets football team represented Kalamazoo College of Kalamazoo, Michigan. In their 16th year under head coach Chester S. Barnard, the Hornets compiled a 1–6–1 record (0–5 against MIAA opponents) and finished in last place in the MIAA.

All-conference team
The following players were selected as first-team players on the All-MIAA football team:

 Quarterback - J. Tait, Alma
 Fullback - Robert Montgomery
 Halfbacks - Morris Trimble, Albion; Steve Dalla, Kalamazoo
 Ends - Keith Carey, Alma; Charles Vanderlinde, Albion
 Tackles - Dick Thompson, Adrian; Paul Van Kueren, Kalamazoo; E. Ziem, Alma
 Guards - Walter Ptak, Albion; G. Barnett, Alma
 Center - Robert Manby, Hillsdale

References